Radoszewo is a defunct PKP railway station in Radoszewo (Pomeranian Voivodeship), Poland.

Lines crossing the station

References 
Radoszewo article at Polish Stations Database, URL accessed at 5 March 2006

Railway stations in Pomeranian Voivodeship
Disused railway stations in Pomeranian Voivodeship
Puck County